Cleveland Clinic Akron General formerly known as Akron General Medical Center, and commonly known as Akron Gen, is a nationally ranked, 511-bed non-profit, teaching hospital located in Akron, Ohio. Cleveland Clinic Akron General is a part of the Cleveland Clinic Health System. As the hospital is a teaching hospital, it is affiliated with the Northeast Ohio Medical University and the Ohio University Heritage College of Osteopathic Medicine. The hospital is also an American College of Surgeons verified Level 1 Trauma Center, the one of two in the region and one of 11 in Ohio. Additionally, the hospital has a rooftop helipad to handle the emergent transport of critical patients to and from the hospital.

History 
On February 20, 1914, the articles of incorporation were filed for the newly established Peoples Hospital Company. On March 1, 1915, the new hospital opened on West Cedar Street with 125-beds, named the Peoples Hospital. Later in 1926, Peoples Hospital became a nonprofit to better serve the underserved in Akron.

In 1954 the hospital was renamed from the Peoples Hospital to Akron General Hospital, then in 1971 renamed to Akron General Medical Center.

From 1971 to 1975 renovations occurred at Akron General Hospital which added physician offices, a coronary care unit, new patient rooms, a hemodialysis unit, new administration offices, an expanded radiation therapy unit, new coronary stress labs, and a 476-space parking deck.

In 2008 Akron General partnered with Akron Children's Hospital to open a new pediatric and adult emergency department at its satellite campus in Bath, Ohio. The new emergency department consists of 17,000-square-feet of space and includes 18 emergency beds. Care for adults is provided from doctors from Akron General while pediatric cases are handled by Akron Children's Hospital.

In 2013 it was announced that they had signed a non-binding letter of intent would be purchased by a joint venture of the for-profit Nashville based, Community Health Systems and Cleveland Clinic. The purchase would have turned Akron General into a for-profit hospital. In 2014 hospital administration announced that they were no longer in talks with Community Health Systems or Cleveland Clinic due to fundamental disagreements.

In 2014 the nationally ranked health system, Cleveland Clinic invested $100 million into Akron General Medical Center and became a minority owner of the hospital. Additionally, the deal allowed the Cleveland Clinic to take over the hospital after a year, and Cleveland Clinic was allowed to choose three board members on Akron Gen's board.

In 2015 Cleveland Clinic decided to take over the hospital and Akron General officially became a part of Cleveland Clinic after the Ohio Attorney General and the Federal Trade Commission both approved the merger. Cleveland Clinic would deal with Akron General's $150 million debt and would make $30 million in improvements to the hospital including a new emergency department and a more modern electronic health record system. The merger totaled up to be one of Ohio's largest health-related mergers in recent history. Additionally, it was later announced that the merger prevented Akron General from going bankrupt.

In 2018 the hospital opened up a new building containing an emergency department, a 19-bed observation unit, and administrative offices. The project cost the hospital $49.3 million and added 67,000-square-feet of space, nearly tripling the size of the previous emergency department. A rooftop helipad is located on top of the new building, and a second floor bridge connects the building to the rest of the main hospital campus.

Awards 
The hospital ranked as "high performing" in 7 adult specialties, as #7 in Ohio and #1 in the Akron metro region on the 2020-21 U.S. News & World Report: Best Hospitals rankings.

See also 

 Cleveland Clinic
 Northeast Ohio Medical University
 Cleveland Clinic Children's Hospital
 Akron Children's Hospital

References

External links 

 

Cleveland Clinic
Trauma centers
Hospital buildings completed in 2018